Keep Smiling may refer to:
Keep Smiling (1925 film), a 1925 film starring Monty Banks
Keep Smiling (1938 film), a 1938 British film starring Gracie Fields
Keep Smiling (2011 film), a 2011 Georgian film
Keep Smiling (album) (1983), by the Danish group Laid Back
"Keep Smiling" (song), a 2015 song by Bars and Melody